Larg Hill is a hill in the Minnigaff Hills, a sub-range of the Galloway Hills range, part of the Southern Uplands of Scotland. The second highest and most westerly of the range, it is normally ascended with Lamachan Hill as part of a round normally starting from the north or south. Historically it was covered by woodland consisting of ash, oak, fir and beech.

References

Mountains and hills of the Southern Uplands
Mountains and hills of Dumfries and Galloway
Donald mountains